The 1957 World Freestyle Wrestling Championship were held in Istanbul, Turkey.

Medal table

Team ranking

Medal summary

Men's freestyle

References
FILA Database

World Wrestling Championships
World 1957
Wrestling
Sport in Istanbul
1957 in sport wrestling
1950s in Istanbul